Avallone may refer to:

Avallone or Avalone, a mostly obsolete variant spelling of Avalon, a legendary place in the Arthurian and Grail cycles
Avallónë, a fictional city in J.R.R. Tolkien's Middle-earth fantasy novels

People with the surname 
Michael Avallone (1924–1999), American writer
Salvatore Avallone (born 1969), Italian footballer

See also
Avallon, a French town